Jung-nam, also spelled Jeong-nam or Jong-nam, is a Korean masculine given name. Its meaning depends on the hanja used to write each syllable of the name.

Hanja and meaning
There are 75 hanja with the reading "jung" and five hanja with the reading "nam" on the South Korean government's official list of hanja which may be registered for use in given names. Some ways of writing this name in hanja include:

, meaning "righteous man". The same characters are also used to write the Japanese masculine given name Masao.

According to South Korean government data, Jung-nam was the eighth-most popular name for newborn boys in 1945.

People
People with this name include:

Entertainers
 (born 1983), South Korean model and TV personality

Sportspeople
Baek Jeong-nam (1936–2005), South Korean basketball player
Kim Jung-nam (born 1943), South Korean football manager
Kim Jeong-nam (rower) (born 1963), South Korean rower
Go Jung-nam (born 1975), South Korean fencer
Yoo Jung-nam (born 1983), South Korean swimmer
Hong Jeong-nam (born 1988), South Korean footballer

Other
Son Jong-nam (1958–2008), North Korean defector and Christian missionary
Jang Jong-nam (born 1960s), North Korean general
Kim Jong-nam (1971–2017), eldest son of former North Korean leader Kim Jong-il
Mun Jong-nam, North Korean diplomat

See also
List of Korean given names

References

Korean masculine given names